A.E. Mylopotamos, short for Athletic Union of Mylopotamos and also simply known as AEM, is a Greek football club, based in Perama, Rethymno, Crete. Their colours are blue and yellow, and their crest is a star, a reference to the club's previous name Asteras Perama (Perama Star). The club currently competes in the regional Rethymno FCA A Division, having previously played in the third tier of the Greek football league system.

History
The club was founded as Athlitiki Enosi Astir Peramatos and was commonly known as Asteras Perama until 2015, when the club's board of directors decided to reach out to the entire Mylopotamos' community and rename the club as A.E. Mylopotamos to represent the whole region. The club managed to win the Rethymno FCA A Division Championship in the 2016−17 season, thus managing promotion to the Gamma Ethniki, the third tier of the Greek football league system for the first time in club history.

Titles & honours

Regional
Rethymno FCA Championship
Winners (5): 1988–89, 1996–97, 2004–05, 2016–17, 2018-19
Rethymno FCA Cup
Winners (7): 1988–89, 1989–90, 1990–91, 1991–92, 1992–93, 2013–14, 2014–15

References

External links 

Football clubs in Rethymno
Football clubs in Crete
Gamma Ethniki clubs